The Avenging Hand is a 1936 British crime film directed by Victor Hanbury and Frank Richardson and starring Noah Beery, Louis Borel and Kathleen Kelly.

It was made at Welwyn Studios as a quota quickie. Duncan Sutherland worked on the film's sets.

Premise
A Chicago gangster staying in a London hotel tries to solve the murder of one of the other guests.

Cast
Noah Beery as Lee Barwell
Louis Borel as Pierre Charrell
Kathleen Kelly as Gwen Taylor
Charles Oliver as Toni Visetti
Reginald Long as Charles Mason
Tarva Penna as Conrad Colter
Penelope Parkes as Elizabeth
Billie De la Volta as Muriel
James Harcourt as Sam Hupp

References

Bibliography
 Low, Rachael. Filmmaking in 1930s Britain. George Allen & Unwin, 1985.
 Wood, Linda. British Films, 1927-1939. British Film Institute, 1986.

External links 

1936 films
1936 crime films
British black-and-white films
Films shot at Welwyn Studios
Quota quickies
Films set in London
Films scored by Jack Beaver
British crime films
Films directed by Frank Richardson
Films directed by Victor Hanbury
1930s English-language films
1930s British films